EEB may refer to:
 Eastern Electricity Board, now Eastern Electricity, an English utility
 Enterprise Electronics Bay, a computer motherboard form factor
 Environment and Ecology Bureau, a Hong Kong policy bureau responsible for environmental regulation
 Euroberlin France, a defunct Franco-German airline
 European Environmental Bureau, a federation of environmental organisations